Croatian-Montenegrin relations are foreign relations between Croatia and Montenegro. Both countries are full members of the Council of Europe, and of the NATO.
Croatia is an EU member and Montenegro is an EU candidate. Since the end of the Croatian War of Independence, the relations have been largely amicable, but a border dispute remains.

Montenegrin and Croatian, official languages in Montenegro and Croatia respectively, are mutually intelligible, being standard varieties of the Serbo-Croatian language.

In late 2002, Croatia and Serbia and Montenegro adopted an interim agreement to settle the disputed Prevlaka peninsula at the entrance of the Bay of Kotor in Croatia's favour, allowing the withdrawal of the UN monitoring mission. This agreement applies to Montenegro since its independence. Countries agreed to settle all possible disputes at International Court of Justice in Hague.

Croatia recognized the independence of Montenegro on June 12, 2006. Both countries established diplomatic relations on July 7, 2006. Croatia has an embassy in Podgorica and a Consulate-General in Kotor.  Montenegro has an embassy in Zagreb.

Relations between the two countries are promoted through the Croatian-Montenegrin Friendship Society "Croatica-Montenegrina".

See also 
 Foreign relations of Croatia
 Foreign relations of Montenegro 
 Accession of Montenegro to the European Union
 Montenegrins of Croatia
 Croats of Montenegro
 Agreement on Succession Issues of the Former Socialist Federal Republic of Yugoslavia

References

External links 
  Croatian Ministry of Foreign Affairs: list of bilateral treaties with Montenegro

 
Montenegro 
Bilateral relations of Montenegro